Kevin DeWalt (born 1959) is a Canadian film and television producer based in Regina, Saskatchewan. He is the former president of the International Quorum of Motion Picture Producers and the past Chairman of the Canadian Film and Television Production Association. DeWalt has produced over 60 films and television shows such as A Score to Settle, The Englishman's Boy, Forsaken and The Tall Man. He is the founder and the CEO of Minds Eye Entertainment, a Canadian film production and distribution company.

Life and career
DeWalt was born in 1959, in Moose Jaw, Saskatchewan. He attended Luther College, University of Regina where he studied music. DeWalt's first production in 1983 was a touring multimedia travelogue using 6 slide projectors and a 16 mm film projector of his three year around the world backpacking travel adventure titled Namaste.

In 1986, DeWalt founded Minds Eye Entertainment with Ken Krawczyk in Regina. The company produces and distributes independent films in the United States as well as Canada. Minds Eye Entertainment has subsidiaries in production and international distribution through its subsidiaries QME Entertainment and Minds Eye International. As the CEO and the Chairman of the company, DeWalt has produced more than 60 films and television shows that have received more than 50 national and international awards as well as 52 nominations between the Genie Awards, Gemini Awards and Canadian Screen Award including 13 wins.

Over the years, DeWalt has held several leadership positions at various organizations within the field of film production such as the former Chairman of the Canadian Film and Television Production Association (CFTPA, now known as Canadian Media Producers Association), past president of the International Quorum of Motion Picture Producers (IQMPP), past board member of the Canada Media Fund, formerly known as Canadian Television Fund and the National Screen Institute.

In 1999, DeWalt was awarded with Chetwynd Award by Canadian Film and Television Production Association for his achievements in Canadian cinema. In the year 2002, he was awarded with the Ernst & Young Entrepreneur of the Year Award in the Media Category. Saskatchewan Motion Picture Association awarded DeWalt with the Centennial Volunteer Industry Leader award in 2005.

Filmography

Source:DeWalt's Filmography at IMDb

References

External links

1959 births
Living people
Film producers from Saskatchewan
People from Moose Jaw
University of Regina alumni